At least four ships of the Imperial Russian Navy have been named Rurik after Rurik, the semi-legendary founder of ancient Russia.

  - a scientific expeditionary vessel that voyaged to Chile, California, the Aleutians, Hawaiʻi, the Marshall Islands, the Marianas and the Philippines
  - a frigate that served in the Crimean War
  - an armoured cruiser sunk at the Battle of Ulsan
  - a Russian armoured cruiser built by Vickers

Russian Navy ship names